CZC may refer to 

Cambridge Zen Center
Chicago Zen Center
Mitsubishi Colt CZC